Valerian Johann von Engelhardt (1798–1856) was a Russian lieutenant general and director of the Russian Institute of Railway Engineers.

Family
Engelhardt was born into the nobility of Livonia as a member of the Engelhardt family on December 24, 1798, the son of Colonel F. H. Engelhardt.

His brother Nikolai Engelhardt also became a lieutenant general and member of the Order of St. George.

Army career
In 1815, he entered military service as a cadet in the Life Guards Regiment of Chasseurs. He was promoted to ensign in 1819.

In 1830, Engelhardt was assigned to the Tenginsky 77th Infantry Regiment, and soon distinguished himself in the campaign in the Kuban, for which he was promoted to captain. In 1832 he was promoted to colonel and transferred to the Volinsky Life Guards Regiment.

In 1831 Engelhardt was promoted to major general and appointed to the 3rd Grenadier Division. In 1842 he was made a commander for special assignments in the independent Caucasian Corps under General Neidgardt.

Director of the Institute of Railway Engineers
In 1843, Engelhardt was appointed director of the Institute of Railway Engineers. On December 4 of the same year, he was awarded the Order of St. George, fourth class, for his 25 years of irreproachable service as an officer. In 1852 he received the rank of lieutenant general and was appointed to a senior post in the Corps of Civil Engineers.

Engelhardt died on May 20, 1856, in St. Petersburg and is buried in the Volkov Lutheran cemetery.

Sources
 
 
 

1798 births
1856 deaths
Valerian
Imperial Russian Army generals
Russian military personnel of the Caucasian War